The Cancer Prevention Institute of California, located in Fremont, California, was a center for cancer research, examining the incidence of cancer among general and specific groups of people at the local, state, and national level. CPIC studies helped scientists and public health agencies understand when ethnic, racial, or other demographic-based variables result in health disparities wherein one group has a higher incidence of cancer compared to other groups of people.

On February 17, 2010, Northern California Cancer Center changed its name to the Cancer Prevention Institute of California (CPIC). The organization closed in 2018.

Over its 44-year history, CPIC published many well-known studies. In 2002, in partnership with the Marin Health Department, the organization reported on the elevated levels of breast cancer among women in Marin County. In 2011, California became the first state to ban minors from tanning beds influenced by CPIC's research that found an elevated level of melanoma among minors who used them. That same year, a CPIC study also found nail salon workers are exposed to an unhealthy amount of toxic chemicals. A CPIC study conducted with Stanford in 2014 found women with early-stage breast cancer treated with bilateral mastectomy did not have better survival than those treated with breast conserving therapy.

External links 
 Cancer Prevention Institute of California Official Website

Medical and health organizations based in California
Cancer organizations based in the United States